The 1975 Limerick Senior Hurling Championship was the 81st staging of the Limerick Senior Hurling Championship since its establishment by the Limerick County Board.

Kilmallock were the defending champions.

On 21 September 1975, Kilmallock won the championship after a 3-14 to 3-07 defeat of Patrickswell in the final. It was their fifth championship title overall and their third title in succession.

Results

Final

References

Limerick Senior Hurling Championship
Limerick Senior Hurling Championship